Beef bourguignon or bœuf bourguignon, also called beef Burgundy, and bœuf à la Bourguignonne, is a French beef stew braised in red wine, often red Burgundy, and beef stock, typically flavored with carrots, onions, garlic, and a bouquet garni, and garnished with pearl onions, mushrooms, and bacon. A similar dish using a piece of braised beef with the same garnish is pièce de bœuf à la bourguignonne.

Its name probably refers to the use of wine; it is likely not a regional recipe from Burgundy.

When made with whole roasts, the meat was often larded.

History
The dish is often "touted as traditional", but it was first documented in 1867, and "does not appear to be very old". Other recipes called "à la Bourguignonne" with similar garnishes are found in the mid-19th century for leg of lamb and for rabbit. In the 19th century, it "did not enjoy a great reputation", perhaps because it was often made with leftover cooked meat.

The dish has become a standard of French cuisine, notably in Parisian bistrots; however, it only began to be considered as a Burgundian specialty in the twentieth century.

The co-authors of Mastering the Art of French Cooking, Simone Beck, Louisette Bertholle and Julia Child, have described the dish as "certainly one of the most delicious beef dishes concocted by man".

Serving

Beef bourguignon is generally accompanied with boiled potatoes or pasta.

Name and spellings

In culinary terminology, "bourguignon" is applied to various dishes prepared with wine or with a mushroom and onion garnish in the mid-nineteenth century.

The dish may be called bourguignon or à la bourguignonne in both French and English. It is occasionally called beef/bœuf bourguignonne in English, but in French, by far the most common name is bœuf bourguignon.

See also

 Beef shank
 Carbonade flamande
 Coq au vin
 Hayashi rice
 List of stews
 Oeufs en meurette
 Sauce bourguignonne

Notes and references

External links

 Julia Child's Beef Bourguignon

French stews
Beef dishes
Wine dishes